Belarusian-Uzbek relations refers to the bilateral relations between the Republic of Belarus and the Republic of Uzbekistan. Diplomatic relations between the two countries were established on 21 January 1993, with the Belarusian Embassy in Tashkent being opened in February 1994. Uzbekistan also has an embassy in Minsk.

State visits
Belarusian President Alexander Lukashenko paid official visits to Uzbekistan in December 1994 and September 2018. According to his former campaign manager Alexander Feduta, Lukashenko in the former visit was asked by Mayor Kozim Tulyaganov through him to allow the performance of young women in traditional clothes to stop, citing that "the women were freezing in their costumes", to which Lukashenko stayed for a further 15 minutes, which Feduta claims displayed the Belarusian leader's "cruelty". Lukashenko's 2018 visit was the first to occur in 24 years, being held on 13–14 September of that year.
 
Uzbek President Islam Karimov visited Minsk in October 2014. His successor Shavkat Mirziyoyev also visited Minsk on 1 August 2019.

Military cooperation
In March 2018, the Academy of the Armed Forces of Uzbekistan and the Military-Technical Institute of the National Guard of Uzbekistan signed a memorandum of cooperation  with the Military Academy of Belarus. That same month, the Defense Minister of Belarus Andrey Ravkov visited Uzbekistan, expressing a readiness to repair and modernize Uzbek armored vehicles and aircraft.

In September 2018, servicemen of Special Forces of the Ministry of Defense of Uzbekistan went to Belarus to participate in competitions among other foreign special forces at a training ground located in the village of Maryina Gorka.

See also 
 Foreign relations of Belarus
 Foreign relations of Uzbekistan

References

Sources 
 The Ministry of Foreign Affairs of Uzbekistan on relations with Belarus and countries in the CIS
 The Ministry of Foreign Affairs of Belarus on relations with Uzbekistan
 Lukashenko receives first copy of Yakub Kolas' poems in Uzbek as gift - eng.belta.by.
 Presidents of Belarus and Uzbekistan meet in Tashkent
 Ministers of Defense of Uzbekistan and Belarus discuss cooperation issues

 
Uzbekistan
Belarus